The 1984–85 Georgia Bulldogs basketball team represented the University of Georgia as a member of the Southeastern Conference during the 1984–85 NCAA men's basketball season. The team was led by head coach Hugh Durham, and played their home games at Stegeman Coliseum in Athens, Georgia. The Bulldogs finished second in the SEC regular season standings, and received an at-large bid to the NCAA tournament as No. 6 seed in the East region. They defeated No. 11 seed Wichita State in the opening round before losing to No. 3 seed Illinois in the round of 32 to finish the season at 22–9 (12–6 SEC).

Roster

Schedule and results

|-
!colspan=9 style=| Non-conference Regular season

|-
!colspan=9 style=| SEC Regular season

|-
!colspan=9 style=| SEC Tournament

|-
!colspan=9 style=| NCAA Tournament

Rankings

References

Georgia Bulldogs basketball seasons
Georgia
Georgia
Georgia Bulldogs
Georgia Bulldogs